Piliki  is a village in the administrative district of Gmina Bielsk Podlaski, within Bielsk County, Podlaskie Voivodeship, in north-eastern Poland.

Podlaskie Region. "Voivodeship" is not a word in English.

References

Piliki